Dağ Üzü (also, Daguzi or Daguzu) is a village and municipality in the Yardymli Rayon of Azerbaijan.  It has a population of 693. It is situated on the Peshtasar mountains.

References 

Populated places in Yardimli District